David Bernard Williams was the dean of the College of Engineering at the Ohio State University from 2011-2021.  He was previously the fifth president of the University of Alabama in Huntsville in Huntsville, Alabama from March 2007 until April 2011, and Vice Provost for Research and Harold Chambers Senior Professor of Materials Science and Engineering at Lehigh University in Bethlehem, Pennsylvania.

Williams was born in Leeds, England, and holds B.A., M.A., Ph.D., and Sc.D. degrees from the University of Cambridge where he also won four Blues in rugby and athletics.

His research and teaching interests’ include: 
 Analytical/Transmission and scanning electron microscopy (X-ray microanalysis, electron energy-loss spectrometry and convergent-beam electron diffraction)
 Applications to interfacial segregation and bonding changes
 Texture and phase-diagram determination in metals and alloys for aerospace and power-generation
 Structure determination in glasses

Together with C. Barry Carter he is the co-author of a 4-volume textbook entitled Transmission Electron Microscopy: A Textbook for Materials Science. held in over 340 libraries, as well as co-editor of two other books.  He is author or co-author of 207 peer-reviewed journals and articles as listed by Scopus, and the former editor  of Acta Materialia and the Journal of Microscopy.

His wife, Margaret, is a native of the Netherlands and was raised in Australia. The couple has three sons, Matthew, Bryn Joseph and Stephen.

Honors
 Fellow of the Royal Microscopical Society (U.K.), 1977
 Fellow of the Institute of Metals (U.K.), 1985–1996
 Fellow of American Society for Materials International, 1988
 President of the Microbeam Analysis Society, 1991–1992
 President of the International Union of Microbeam Analysis Societies, 1994–2000
 Fellow of The Minerals, Metals and Materials Society
 Doctor of Science (Sc.D.) Cambridge University, 2001
 American Welding Society, Warren F. Savage Memorial Award  for the best paper published in the Welding Journal, 2004
 First recipient of the Duncumb Award of the Microbeam Analysis Society, 2007
 Fellow of the Microscopy Society of America, 2010
 Honorary Member of the Microbeam Analysis Society, 2014

References

External links
https://web.archive.org/web/20110819144709/http://engineering.osu.edu/overview/index.php

Alumni of the University of Cambridge
Lehigh University faculty
Living people
Ohio State University faculty
People from Leeds
Presidents of the University of Alabama in Huntsville
Year of birth missing (living people)
Fellows of the Royal Microscopical Society
English emigrants to the United States
Fellows of the Minerals, Metals & Materials Society